Charles Davis Lowe II (born January 15, 1968) is an American actor. He is the younger brother of actor Rob Lowe. He won an Emmy Award for his supporting role in Life Goes On as a young man living with HIV. He has had recurring roles on ER, Melrose Place, and Now and Again. Lowe played Deputy White House Chief of Staff Reed Pollock on the sixth season of 24, and played Byron Montgomery on Pretty Little Liars.

Early life
Lowe was born in Dayton, Ohio, the son of Barbara Lynn Wilson (née Hepler; 1939–2003), a teacher, and Charles Davis Lowe, a trial lawyer. His parents divorced when Lowe was young. He has an older brother, actor Rob Lowe, and two half brothers from the second marriages of his parents, the producer Micah Dyer (maternal) and Justin Lowe (paternal). Lowe was baptized into the Episcopal church. He is of German, English, Irish, Scottish, and Welsh ancestry.

Lowe was raised in a "traditional midwestern setting" in Dayton, attending Oakwood Junior High School, before moving to the Point Dume area of Malibu, California, with his mother and brother. He attended Santa Monica High School, the same high school as fellow actors Emilio Estevez, Charlie Sheen, Sean Penn, Chris Penn, and Robert Downey Jr.

Career
Lowe began his acting career in the 1980s when he appeared in a number of television films. Lowe co-starred with Charlie Sheen in the 1984 CBS Television drama Silence of the Heart. In 1988 he co-starred with Tommy Lee Jones and Robert Urich in the made-for-TV film April Morning, which depicted the battle of Lexington in the American Revolutionary War. Lowe played the title character in the short-lived sitcom Spencer, which he left after six episodes.

From 1991 to 1993, he starred in Life Goes On, for which he received the Primetime Emmy Award for Outstanding Supporting Actor in a Drama Series in 1993.

Lowe had recurring roles on Melrose Place, Popular, Now and Again, and ER, and guest-starring roles on Touched by an Angel, Superman, CSI: Miami and Medium. Lowe's feature film appearances have included roles in Nobody's Perfect, True Blood, Quiet Days in Hollywood, Floating, and Unfaithful. In 2000, he portrayed iconic singer John Denver in the made-for-television movie Take Me Home. That year he also wrote and directed the short film The Audition. Lowe made his feature film directorial debut in 2007 with Beautiful Ohio. Lowe has directed episodes of Bones, Brothers and Sisters, Law & Order: Special Victims Unit, Hack, Without a Trace, and Pretty Little Liars.

In April 2010, Lowe replaced Alexis Denisof as Aria's father, Byron Montgomery, in Pretty Little Liars.

Personal life
While filming Quiet Days in Hollywood, Lowe met actress Hilary Swank. They married on September 28, 1997. On January 9, 2006, Lowe and Swank announced their separation, and in May 2006, they announced their intention to divorce. The divorce was finalized on November 1, 2007. Swank infamously forgot to thank Lowe during her acceptance speech after winning her first Academy Award in 2000 (for Boys Don't Cry). Upon winning her second Oscar in 2005, for Million Dollar Baby, Lowe was the first person she thanked.

On January 19, 2007, a representative announced that Lowe was dating producer Kim Painter. Lowe and Painter's daughter was born on May 16, 2009. Lowe and Painter were married on August 28, 2010, in a small ceremony in Los Angeles. They welcomed their second daughter on November 15, 2012. They welcomed their third daughter on March 18, 2016.

Filmography

Film

Television

Director

Producer

Awards and nominations

References

External links
 

1968 births
American male child actors
American male film actors
American Episcopalians
American male television actors
American television directors
Living people
Outstanding Performance by a Supporting Actor in a Drama Series Primetime Emmy Award winners
Male actors from Dayton, Ohio
Film directors from Ohio
20th-century American Episcopalians